Eupinivora ponderosae is a species of moth of the family Tortricidae. It is found in the montane regions of the western United States from Nevada, Utah, Wyoming and Colorado, south to Arizona and New Mexico and east to Texas. The habitat consists of conifer-dominated areas at elevations ranging from 1,700 to 2,700 meters.

The length of the forewings is 7.5–9 mm for males and 8.5–9.5 mm for females. The basal part of the forewings is pale orange, but slightly paler orange along the dorsum. There is a slightly darker orange blotch in upper distal half of the discal cell. The remainder of the wing is white with scattered patches of pale orange. The hindwings are pale grey. Adult have been recorded on wing from June to July, although there is a single record from late May (Texas).

The larvae have been reared from Pinus ponderosa

Etymology
The species name refers to the putative larval host and dominant tree in its habitat, the ponderosa pine (Pinus ponderosa).

References

Moths described in 2013
Cochylini